{{Infobox webcomic| 
| title = Arbit Choudhury
| image = 
| caption = A comic strip portraying Arbit Choudhury
| author = Shubham Choudhury and Hemantkumar Jain
| url = 
| status = 
| began = 2004
| ended =
| genre = Business school, Coming of age
| ratings =
}}Arbit Choudhury is a coming of age webcomic run in the format of a comic strip from India.

 Plot 
The plot of each strip revolves around the protagonist named "Arbit Choudhury" who is an MBA student. Choudhury is a common Indian surname while the word "Arbit" refers to the arbitrary ways of the protagonist. The strip deals with the campus life of a B-school student, replete with jargon and has Arbit Choudhury making mockery of management concepts and theories. He is characterised as a student with big dreams and bigger mouth, studying at a leading business school. Each strip is carried in a single panel and is not serialised (that is, each strip is complete in itself).

 Development 
The webcomic and its protagonist were created by Shubham Choudhury and Hemantkumar Jain in 2004, then students at NITIE, Mumbai. It was initially created to serve as a mascot to the online contest MastishK' 04, which is part of Prerana, the inter-collegiate youth festival of the institute. In the subsequent years, competitions were held among the students of various B-schools, to identify good ideas for the comic strip, in addition to the ideas generated by the creators themselves. The concept of a comic strip revolving around the life of a B-school student proved successful at the festival and this led to its transformation into a webcomic. 

The strip is updated once every 15 days. Apart from the regular ideas, patrons can also submit ideas for Arbit Choudhury through its website and such contributions are acknowledged as contributors in the strip itself.

 Awards Arbit Choudhury'' was awarded with the Manthan Award for demonstrating how ICT could be used as an effective marketing tool.

References

External links
 Bombay Times dated 18 October 2005 - when A meets B A supplement from Times of India
 Making of Arbit Choudhury
 Listing at Onlinecomics.net
 Interview of Creators

2000s webcomics
School webcomics
Coming-of-age webcomics
Student culture in India
2004 webcomic debuts
Indian webcomics